Östersunds DFF is a Swedish football club in Östersund, Sweden. The club was formed 2001 as a co-operation between two Östersund clubs, originally using the name Storsjöns DFF, which was later changed to Ope-Frösö DFF and finally to Östersunds DFF in 2004. They are affiliated to the Jämtland-Härjedalens Fotbollförbund and play their home games at Jämtkraft Arena.

In October 2014, the club was promoted to Elitettan, the second tier of women's football in Sweden, for the first time in club history, and it finished in 8th place in 2015.

Current squad

Season to season

References

Football clubs in Jämtland County
2001 establishments in Sweden
Association football clubs established in 2001
Sport in Östersund